Bua is one of fourteen provinces of Fiji.  Located in the west of the northern island of Vanua Levu, it is one of three northern provinces, and has a land area of 1,379 square kilometers within the three main districts of Bua, Vuya and Wainunu.  Its population at the 2017 census was 15,466, making it the fifth least-populous Province.

Bua is governed by a Provincial Council, chaired by Ratu Filimone Ralogaivau.

Bua also is one of the port of entries into Vanua Levu. This port is located in Nabouwalu that is equipped with a jetty where ships berth. Fiji government is soon planning to declare Nabouwalu a township.

References

 
Bua
Bua